Daniel Neyland (1618–1688) was an Irish Anglican priest in the 17th century.

Neyland was  born in County Clare and educated at Trinity College, Dublin. Neyland was Prebendary of St Michan's in Christ Church Cathedral, Dublin from 1661 until his death;  Dean of Elphin from 1664 to 1665; and Dean of Ossory from 1666 until his death.

References 

People from County Clare
Deans of Elphin
1618 births
17th-century Irish Anglican priests
1668 deaths